Rich Christiano (born October 2, 1956) is an American filmmaker, who has directed, produced and written many Christian films. He owns Christiano Film Group, co-founded Five & Two Pictures and founded ChristianMovies.com in 1997. He is also the twin brother of Dave Christiano.

Filmography

Publications

References

External links
 ChristianMovies.com
 The Christiano Brothers Story
 

1956 births
Living people
American Christians
American film directors
American film producers
St. John Fisher College alumni